The Columbian Magazine, also known as the Columbian Magazine or Monthly Miscellany, was a monthly American literary magazine established by Mathew Carey, Charles Cist, William Spotswood, Thomas Seddon, and James Trenchard. It was published in Philadelphia from 1786 to 1792. Carey left the magazine in 1787 to start The American Museum. Subsequent publishers were Spotswood (1787–1788), Trenchard (1789–1790), and William Young (1790–1792).

See also
 The American Museum

References

Magazines established in 1786
Magazines disestablished in 1792
1792 disestablishments in the United States
Defunct literary magazines published in the United States
Magazines published in Philadelphia